"Mambo Italiano" is a popular song written by Bob Merrill in 1954 for the American singer Rosemary Clooney. The song became a hit for Clooney, reaching the Top Ten in record charts in the US and France and No. 1 in the UK Singles Chart early in 1955. The song has shown enduring popularity, with several cover versions and appearances in numerous films.

Writing and original Rosemary Clooney version 

Merrill reportedly wrote it under a recording deadline, scribbling hastily on a paper napkin in an Italian restaurant in New York City, and then using the wall pay-phone to dictate the melody, rhythm and lyrics to the studio pianist, under the aegis of the conductor Mitch Miller, who produced the original record. Alongside Merrill, 'Lidianni' and 'Gabba' are also listed as writers of the song, corresponding to the pseudonyms of the Italian lyricists Gian Carlo Testoni and Gaspare Abbate, respectively.

Merrill's song provides an obvious parody of genuine mambo music, cashing in on the 1954 mambo craze in New York, while at the same time allowing Miller to set up a vehicle for Clooney's vocal talents. It is also a late example of an American novelty song in a tradition started during World War II by the Italian-American jazz singer Louis Prima, in which nonsense lyrics with an Italian-American sound are used in such a way as to present a stereotyped caricature of Italian-American people (who had been classed with "enemy alien" status and discouraged from speaking Italian) as likable, slightly brash, pleasure-loving folk. Although Clooney's own family background was Irish-American, she could perform such "Italianized" material with an entirely convincing accent, which she had readily picked up from Italian-American musicians and their families.

The nonsense lyrics were originally couched in English, mixed together with a comic jumble of Italian, Spanish, Neapolitan and gibberish (invented) words, including:
Italian: italiano (Italian), Napoli (Naples), siciliano (Sicilian), calabrese (Calabrian), tarantella (tarantella), mozzarella (mozzarella), pizza, baccalà (salted codfish), bambino (child), vino (wine). 
Spanish: mambo, enchilada, rumba, (the Spanish words mambo and rumba are commonly used in Italian with the same meaning).
Neapolitan: paisà (in Italian paesano; in English villager or fellow countryman).
A number of Italian words are deliberately misspelled ("Giovanno" instead of "Giovanni", and "hello, che se dice" for "hello, what's up?"). Other words are in Italiese (goombah, from cumpà, literally godson/godfather but more broadly fellow countryman, and 'jadrool' or 'cidrule", a stupid person, closely related to cetriolo, Italian for "cucumber", but in Sicilian meaning jackass. The word tiavanna is a malapropism for Tijuana.

Chart history

Weekly charts
The song reached No. 8 on the U.S. Cash Box Top 50 Best Selling Records chart, in a tandem ranking of Don Cornell, Nick Noble, Kay Armen, and Roy Rogers & Dale Evans's versions, with Don Cornell and Nick Noble's versions marked as bestsellers. The song also reached No. 7 on Billboards Honor Roll of Hits, with Don Cornell and Nick Noble's versions listed as best sellers.

In Australia, the song charted regionally.  It entered the Brisbane charts in January 1956, and reached No. 3. In Sydney, it charted twice: in January, when it reached No. 10 (in a 10-song Hit Parade), and again in March 1956 when it went to No. 4.

Cover versions

Dean Martin version 
It was successfully covered in 1955 by the popular Italian-American star Dean Martin. In 2022, Martin's version is played briefly in a streaming commercial for Airbnb.

In 2006, the German Nu jazz and Lounge music act Club des Belugas officially released a remix of the Dean Martin version on their album Apricoo Soul, with official authorization on behalf of Capitol Records/EMI and Martin's estate.

Carla Boni version 
Mambo Italiano became popular in Italy when Carla Boni scored a major hit with her version of 1956. Also in 1956, Renato Carosone, a singer and band leader from Naples, recorded a successful version that weaves in several fragments of Neapolitan song, of which he was a leading exponent.

Shaft version 

British electronica duo Shaft covered the song and released it as a single in 2000. It was the follow-up to their 1999 hit, "(Mucho Mambo) Sway". This version reached number 12 on the UK Singles Chart and peaked within the top 40 in Australia, Denmark, Iceland, Ireland, and Sweden. It was later included on the duo's 2001 album, Pick Up on This.

Charts 
Weekly charts

Year-end charts

Certifications

Other cover versions 
Cover versions of the song made in other languages include a French translation made by the Turkish polyglot singer Darío Moreno. Other covers in various genres from around the world include a salsa setting by the Italian musician Massimo Scalici; a V-pop version by the Vietnamese group Hồ Quang Hiếu; a Mandarin version by Hong Kong singer Paula Tsui; an instrumental by the Swedish electric guitarist Mattias Eklundh; a Latin ska number by Federico Fosati and Dinamo from Mallorca. Bette Midler remade "Mambo italiano" for her 2002 album Bette Midler Sings the Rosemary Clooney Songbook. Patrizio Buanne released a cover on his album Patrizio in 2009. Dean Martin's daughter, Deana Martin released a cover on her 2006 album Memories Are Made of This. The "Mambo Italiano" tune features at the start of Lady Gaga's 2011 song "Americano". Gaga later performed "Mambo Italiano" during her Jazz & Piano residency in Las Vegas. Iggy Azalea samples the song in her 2019 single "Lola".

Use in films 

In the 1955 Italian comedy film Scandal in Sorrento, Sophia Loren dances to an instrumental arrangement of the tune, opposite Vittorio De Sica in a simplified imitation of mambo dancing.

The song was also used in the beginning credits of the 1988 mob comedy Married to the Mob starring Alec Baldwin, during a dancing scene in the 1996 film Big Night, and in the 1999 comedy Mickey Blue Eyes starring Hugh Grant and James Caan.

References

External links
Audio at Internet Archive

1954 singles
UK Singles Chart number-one singles
Rosemary Clooney songs
Bette Midler songs
Dean Martin songs
Songs written by Bob Merrill
Musical parodies
Novelty songs